Martin vom Brocke (born 25 July 1969) is a Swiss dentist, orthodontist and book author.

Life and scientific work 
Vom Brocke studied dentistry at University of Bern from 1992 to 1997, and finished his doctoral theses (Ph.D.) in 2000. In 2013 he achieved a degree as Master of Science in Orthodontics at Danube University Krems (Prof. Dr. Dr. Dieter Müßig). Since 2010 he does research work on the long-known problems and insufficiencies of Edward Angle's classification system of malocclusions (published in 1899), on cephalometric analysis and on related topics.

In 2015 he proposed a new dental classification system that integrates the position of the ears, the chin, the nose, the eyes, tooth sizes, the occlusion and the second dentition, the structural relations between these parameters being described by Riemann's ζ4 function. Like Angle's system, vom Brocke's classification is primarily based on the positional relationship of the first small molar teeth (premolars).

Publications 
 Struction - The Harmonious Theory of Relativity. Inspiration Un Limited, London/Berlin 2015, 126 p., 
 Strukturieren - Fördert strukturiertes Lernen des Studienerfolg?. Inspiration Un Limited, London/Berlin 2016, 
 Strukturiert - Wie lassen sich mit DVT orale Strukturen vergleichen? [Master Theses of 2013]. Inspiration Un Limited, London/Berlin 2016, 130 p., 
 Struktur - Warum sehen unsere Köpfe nicht aus wie Steine?.  Inspiration Un Limited, London/Berlin 2016, 
 Zahnorthopädie - Harmonische Anpassung fordert neues zahnmedizinisches Vorgehen. Inspiration Un Limited, London/Berlin 2016, 
 Zahnorthopädie - Eine neue Referenz in der Orthodontie und dento-fazialen Orthopädie. Inspiration Un Limited, London/Berlin 2016,  (= 2nd edition of )
 Tooth Orthopaedia - A new Reference in Orthodontics and Dentofacial Orthopedics. Inspiration Un Limited, London/Berlin 2016, 136 p., 
 Zahnorthopädie - Eine neue Referenz in der Orthodontie und dento-fazialen Orthopädie. Inspiration Un Limited, London/Berlin 2017,  (= e-book edition of )
 Scientific Basis of the Structural Gravitation Theory. Inspiration Un Limited, London/Berlin 2022,  (= e-book edition of )

References

1969 births
Orthodontists
Swiss medical researchers
People from Solothurn
Living people